Harbuziv is a village (selo) in Ternopil Raion of Ternopil Oblast (province of Western Ukraine). It belongs to Zboriv urban hromada, one of the hromadas of Ukraine. The population of the village is about 303 people and Local government is administered by Harbuzivska village council.

Geography 
The village is located in the upper reaches of the Seret-Pravyy River (left tributary of the Dniester).

History and Attractions 
The date of establishment the village is considered 1483, but the first record on the village dates back to 1232 year.

Until 18 July 2020, Harbuziv belonged to Zboriv Raion. The raion was abolished in July 2020 as part of the administrative reform of Ukraine, which reduced the number of raions of Ternopil Oblast to three. The area of Zboriv Raion was merged into Ternopil Raion.

Archeological sights of ancient culture early Iron Age has been discovered near the village Harbuziv.

In the village there is a church of St. Nicholas. And in the village has been preserved botanical nature monument an ancient linden tree " Harbuzivska lypa ".

References

External links 
 village Harbuziv
 weather.in.ua
 Новинний портал “за Збручем” На Зборівщині 150-річні гігантські липи стали пам’ятками 
 iTouchMap Harbuziv, Ukraine

Literature 
 

Villages in Ternopil Raion